Badnapur Assembly constituency is one of the 288 Vidhan Sabha (legislative assembly) constituencies of Maharashtra state in western India.

Overview

Badnapur is part of Jalna Lok Sabha constituency along with five other Vidhan Sabha segments, namely, Jalna and Bhokardan in Jalna district and Silod, Phulambri and Paithan in Aurangabad district.

Members of Legislative Assembly
 1990: Narayanrao Satawaji Chavan, Shiv Sena
 1995: Narayanrao Satawaji Chavan, Shiv Sena
 1999: Narayanrao Satawaji Chavan, Shiv Sena
 2004: Arvind Bajirao Chavan, Nationalist Congress Party
 2009: Santosh Pundalik Sambre, Shiv Sena
 2014: Narayan Tilakchand Kuche, Bharatiya Janata Party
 2019: Narayan Tilakchand Kuche, Bharatiya Janata Party

Election results

Assembly Elections 2004

Assembly Elections 2009

Assembly Elections 2014

References

Assembly constituencies of Jalna district
Assembly constituencies of Maharashtra